In Marxist philosophy, cultural hegemony is the dominance of a culturally diverse society by the ruling class who manipulate the culture of that society—the beliefs and explanations, perceptions, values, and mores—so that the worldview of the ruling class becomes the accepted cultural norm. As the universal dominant ideology, the ruling-class worldview misrepresents the social, political, and economic status quo as natural, inevitable, and perpetual social conditions that benefit every social class, rather than as artificial social constructs that benefit only the ruling class.

In philosophy and in sociology, the denotations and the connotations of term cultural hegemony derive from the Ancient Greek word hegemonia (ἡγεμονία), which indicates the leadership and the régime of the hegemon. In political science, hegemony is the geopolitical dominance exercised by an empire, the hegemon (leader state) that rules the subordinate states of the empire by the threat of intervention, an implied means of power, rather than by threat of direct rule—military invasion, occupation, and territorial annexation.

Background

Historical

In 1848, Karl Marx proposed that the economic recessions and practical contradictions of a capitalist economy would provoke the working class to proletarian revolution, depose capitalism, restructure social institutions (economic, political, social) per the rational models of socialism, and thus begin the transition to a communist society.  Therefore, the dialectical changes to the functioning of the economy of a society determine its social superstructures (culture and politics).

To that end, Antonio Gramsci proposed a strategic distinction between the politics for a War of Position and for a War of Manœuvre. The war of position is an intellectual and cultural struggle wherein the anti-capitalist revolutionary creates a proletarian culture whose native value system counters the cultural hegemony of the bourgeoisie. The proletarian culture will increase class consciousness, teach revolutionary theory and historical analysis, and thus further develop revolutionary organisation among the social classes. After winning the war of position, socialist leaders would then have the necessary political power and popular support to realise the war of manœuvre, the political praxis of revolutionary socialism.

Political economy
As Marxist philosophy, cultural hegemony analyses the functions of economic class within the base and superstructure, from which Gramsci developed the functions of social class within the social structures created for and by cultural domination. In the practise of imperialism, cultural hegemony occurs when the working and the peasant classes believe and accept that the prevailing cultural norms of a society (the dominant ideology imposed by the ruling class) realistically describes the natural order of things in society.

In the war for position, the working-class intelligentsia politically educate the working classes to perceive that the prevailing cultural norms are not natural and inevitable social conditions, and to recognize that the social constructs of bourgeois culture function as instruments of socio-economic domination, e.g. the institutions (state, church, and social strata), the conventions (custom and tradition), and beliefs (religions and ideologies), etc. That to realise their own working-class culture the workers and the peasants, by way of their own intellectuals, must perform the necessary analyses of their culture and national history in order for the proletariat to transcend the old ways of thinking about the order of things in a society under the cultural hegemony of an imperial power.

Social domination
Cultural hegemony is neither a monolithic intellectual praxis (politics and policies), nor a unified system of values (ideology), but a complex of social relations produced by the social stratification of the individual social structures of a society; the social class system and the social strata of each class. Social cohesion arises from each social and economic class having a specific societal purpose, and each class has an in-group subculture that allows social behaviours particular to and different from the behaviours of other social classes; the social structures establish and demarcate the cohesive social order. Consequent to their assigned socio-economic purposes, the social classes will intellectually coalesce into a society with a greater sense of national purpose, determined in the dominant ideology of the ruling class.

Gramsci said that cultural and historical analyses of the "natural order of things in society" established by the dominant ideology, would allow common-sense men and women to intellectually perceive the social structures of bourgeois cultural hegemony. In each sphere of life (private and public) common sense  is the intellectualism with which people cope with and explain their daily life within their social stratum within the greater social order; yet the limits of common sense inhibit a person's intellectual perception of the exploitation of labour made possible with cultural hegemony. Given the difficulty in perceiving the status quo hierarchy of bourgeois culture (social and economic classes), most people concern themselves with private matters, and so do not question the fundamental sources of their socio-economic oppression, individual and collective.

Intelligentsia
To perceive and combat ruling-class cultural hegemony, the working class and the peasant class depend upon the moral and political leadership of their native intelligentsia, the  scholars, academics, and teachers, scientists, philosophers, administrators et al. from their specific social classes; thus Gramsci's political distinction between the intellectuals of the bourgeoisie and the intellectuals of the working class, respectively, the men and women who are the proponents and the opponents of the cultural status quo:

After Gramsci

German student movement
In 1967, regarding the politics and society of West Germany, the leader of the German Student Movement, Rudi Dutschke, applied Gramsci's analyses of cultural hegemony using the phrase the "Long March through the Institutions" to describe the ideological work necessary to realise the war of position. The allusion to the Long March (1934–35) of the Chinese People's Liberation Army indicates the great work required of the working-class intelligentsia to produce the working-class popular culture with which to replace the dominant ideology imposed by the cultural hegemony of the bourgeoisie.

State apparatuses of ideology
In Ideology and Ideological State Apparatuses (1970),  Louis Althusser describes the complex of social relationships among the different organs of the State that transmit and disseminate the dominant ideology to the populations of a society. The ideological state apparatuses (ISA) are the sites of ideological conflict among the social classes of a society; and, unlike the military and police forces, the repressive state apparatuses (RSA), the ISA exist as a plurality throughout society.

Despite the ruling-class control of the RSA, the ideological apparatuses of the state are both the sites and the stakes (the objects) of class struggle, because the ISA are not monolithic social entities, and exist amongst society. As the public and the private sites of continual class struggle, the ideological apparatuses of the state (ISA) are overdetermined zones of society that are composed of elements of the dominant ideologies of previous modes of production, hence the continual political activity in:

 the religious ISA (the clergy)
 the educational ISA (the public and private school systems)
 the family ISA (patriarchal family)
 the legal ISA (police and legal, court and penal systems)
 the political ISA (political parties)
 the company union ISA
 the mass communications ISA (print, radio, television, internet, cinema)
 the cultural ISA (literature, the arts, sport, etc.)

The parliamentary structures of the State, by which elected politicians exercise the will of the people also are an ideological apparatus of the State, given the State's control of which populations are allowed to participate as political parties. In itself, the political system is an ideological apparatus, because citizens' participation involves intellectually accepting the ideological "fiction, corresponding to a 'certain' reality, that the component parts of the [political] system, as well as the principle of its functioning, are based on the ideology of the 'freedom' and 'equality' of the individual voters and the 'free choice' of the people's representatives, by the individuals that 'make up' the people".

See also

 
 
 
 
 Domination and the Arts of Resistance: Hidden Transcripts (1990), by James C. Scott
 
 
 Hegemony and Socialist Strategy (1985), by Ernesto Laclau and Chantal Mouffe
 
 "Ideology and Ideological State Apparatuses" (1970), by Louis Althusser
 
 
 
 
 
 Sheeple
 
 
 
 
 The Structural Transformation of the Public Sphere: An Inquiry into a Category of Bourgeois Society (1962), by Jürgen Habermas

References

Further reading 
 
 

Bessis, Sophie (2003) Western Supremacy: The Triumph of an Idea.  Zed Books.   
 .

External links 
 .
 .
 .
 .
 
 .
 .

 
Anti-corporate activism
Conflict theory
Antonio Gramsci
Marxist terminology
Marxist theory
Postcolonialism
Postmodern theory
Social concepts
Socialism